Fyodor I Ivanovich or Feodor I Ioannovich (31 May 1557 – 17 January (NS) 1598), also known as Feodor the Bellringer, reigned as Tsar of Russia from 1584 until his death in 1598.

Feodor's mother died when he was three, and he grew up in the shadow of his father, Ivan the Terrible. A pious man of retiring disposition, Feodor took little interest in politics, and the country was effectively administered in his name by Boris Godunov, the brother of his beloved wife Irina. His childless death marked the end of the Rurik dynasty, and spurred Russia's descent into the catastrophic Time of Troubles.

In Russian documents, Feodor is sometimes called blessed. He is also listed in the "Great Synaxaristes" of the Orthodox Church, with his feast day on January 7 (OS).

Background
Feodor was born in Moscow, the son of Ivan the Terrible by his first wife Anastasia Romanovna. Although he was the sixth and youngest child of his mother, he grew up with only one older brother, Ivan Ivanovich, because all his other older siblings died before Feodor was one year old. His mother also died by the time Feodor was three years old, and her death greatly affected his father, who had been very attached to his wife. Ivan the Terrible began to earn his sobriquet during the years of Feodor's childhood. He also took a series of other wives, but Feodor's only surviving half-sibling, Dmitry of Uglich, was 25 years his junior.

Feodor therefore grew up in the shadow of a terrible father, with no mother to succor him, and only his older brother Ivan Ivanovich for family solidarity. He grew to be sickly of health and diffident of temperament. He was extremely pious by nature, spending hours in prayer and contemplation. He was very fond of visiting churches, and would often cause the bells to be rung according to a special tradition in the Russian Orthodox Church. For this reason, he is known to history as Feodor the Bellringer. He is also listed in the Great Synaxaristes of the Orthodox Church, with his feast day on January 7.

Overall he was considered a good-natured, simple-minded man who took little interest in politics. By some reports, he may have had either an intellectual disability or a learning disability, but this may have been a misinterpretation of his nature and behavior.

Marriage
In 1580, Feodor married Irina (Alexandra) Feodorovna Godunova (1557 – 26 October/23 November 1603), sister of Ivan's minister, Boris Godunov. Although the marriage was arranged by the Tsar and the couple knew nothing of each other before their wedding day, they went on to have a strong marriage. The lonely Feodor soon grew extremely close to his wife, to a degree that was unusual for that period and milieu. Husband and wife shared a relationship of warmth and trust which was the support of Feodor's life as long as he lived.

However, Feodor and Irina's marriage did not immediately produce children, and may not have even been consummated for some years. It was only in 1592, after almost twelve years of marriage, that Tsaritsa Irina gave birth to a daughter, who was named Feodosia after her father. Feodor and his wife doted on their daughter, who however died aged two in 1594. There were no other children from the marriage.

Reign

In November 1581, Feodor's elder brother Ivan Ivanovich was killed by their father in a fit of rage. His death meant that Feodor became the heir to his father's throne. He had never been considered a candidate for the Russian throne until that moment, and was not a little daunted by the prospect. One year later, in October 1582, his father's latest wife bore a son, Dmitry of Uglich, who was Feodor's only surviving sibling.

Ivan the Terrible died in March 1584, and Feodor became Tsar. Two months later, on 31 May 1584, he was crowned Tsar and Autocrat of all Russia at Dormition Cathedral in Moscow.

Feodor was only the nominal ruler: his wife's brother and trusted minister Boris Godunov legitimized himself, after Ivan IV's death, as a de facto regent for the weak and disabled Feodor. Feodor's failure to sire other children brought an end to the centuries-old central branch of the Rurik dynasty (although many princes of later times are descendants of Rurik as well). Feodor was succeeded as tsar by Godunov. The termination of the dynasty resulted in the Time of Troubles. He died in Moscow and was buried at Archangel Cathedral, Kremlin.

His troubled reign was dramatised by Aleksey Konstantinovich Tolstoy in his verse drama Tsar Fiodor Ioannovich (1868).

Foreign policy
Unlike his father, Feodor had no enthusiasm for maintaining exclusive trading rights with the Kingdom of England. Feodor declared his kingdom open to all foreigners, and dismissed the English ambassador Sir Jerome Bowes, whose pomposity had been tolerated by Feodor's father. Elizabeth I sent a new ambassador, Giles Fletcher, the Elder, to demand of Boris Godunov that he convince the tsar to reconsider. The negotiations failed because Fletcher addressed Feodor with two of his titles omitted. Even after this setback, Elizabeth continued to address Feodor on that topic in half appealing, half reproachful letters. She proposed an alliance between Russia and England, something which she had refused to do when it had been sought by Feodor's father, but he turned her down.

See also
 Bibliography of Russian history (1223–1613)
Tsars of Russia family tree

References

1557 births
1598 deaths
16th-century Russian monarchs
Candidates for the Polish elective throne
Russian saints of the Eastern Orthodox Church
Eastern Orthodox monarchs
Royalty and nobility with disabilities
Russian tsars
Yurievichi family
16th-century Russian people
Russian tsareviches